Gene Anderson may refer to:

 Gene Anderson (actress) (1931–1965), British actress
 Gene Anderson (basketball) (1917–1999), American professional basketball player
 Gene Anderson (wrestler) (1939–1991), American professional wrestler

See also
 Jean Andersen (born 1988), South African tennis player	
 Jean Anderson (disambiguation)
Eugene Anderson (disambiguation)